Paula Nordhus (28 March 1935 - 21 March 1994) was a Norwegian politician for the Christian Democratic Party.

She served as a deputy representative to the Norwegian Parliament from Troms during the terms 1981–1985 and 1985–1989.

References

1935 births
1994 deaths
Christian Democratic Party (Norway) politicians
Deputy members of the Storting
Women members of the Storting
20th-century Norwegian women politicians
20th-century Norwegian politicians